Transformers: The Last Knight is a 2017 American science fiction action film based on Hasbro's Transformers toy line. The film is the fifth installment in the Transformers film series and the sequel to Transformers: Age of Extinction (2014). The film is directed by Michael Bay from a screenplay by Art Marcum, Matt Holloway, and Ken Nolan. It stars Mark Wahlberg reprising his role from Age of Extinction, while Josh Duhamel, John Turturro, and Glenn Morshower reprise their roles from the first three films, as well as Laura Haddock, Isabela Moner, Jerrod Carmichael, Santiago Cabrera, and Anthony Hopkins all joining the cast.

Transformers: The Last Knight premiered on June 18, 2017 at the Odeon Leicester Square in London and was released in the United States on June 21. The film received negative reviews from critics, who called it "cacophonous [and] thinly plotted". It was a box-office bomb, grossing $605 million worldwide against a production budget between $217–260 million, with an estimated loss of over $100 million for both Paramount and Hasbro after marketing and distribution costs. A spin-off/prequel titled Bumblebee, was released on December 21, 2018 to critical and financial success, with Bay as a producer.

Plot
In 484 AD, Merlin finds the Knights of Iacon, a group of Transformers hiding on Earth, seeking their help to aid King Arthur and his knights. They hand him a staff and help Arthur defeat the Saxons, but warn Merlin to hide the staff.

In the present, one year after the Hong Kong incident, Optimus Prime arrives on the ruins of Cybertron and meets the mad Cybertronian goddess Quintessa, who brainwashes him into Nemesis Prime, and sends him to Earth to retrieve Merlin's staff, to restore the planet by taking Earth's energy core.

On Earth, a new paramilitary task force called the Transformers Reaction Force (TRF) continues to hunt Transformers, while some of its U.S. military personnel, including Colonel William Lennox and General Morshower, are reluctantly against its actions. Cade Yeager, an ally to the Autobots, hides Transformer refugees in his junkyard. In a war-torn Chicago, Cade and Bumblebee meet a scavenger Izabella and her Transformer companion, Sqweeks, before encountering a dying Transformer who gives them a talisman. The TRF confronts Cade to demand the Autobots' location, only to be stopped by Bumblebee, Lennox, and Hound.

Megatron, having abandoned his Galvatron identity, his remaining Decepticons, and the U.S. government learn of the talisman's value and reluctantly join forces to retrieve it and track Bumblebee to Cade's scrapyard. While the Autobots fend off the Decepticons, Grimlock and the Dinobots ambush a TRF convoy while Cade, his assistant Jimmy, Izabella, and Sqweeks deal with a swarm of TRF drones sent after them. Cogman, a human-sized Transformer, appears and invites Cade to the United Kingdom to meet his employer, Sir Edmund Burton, who is connected to the Transformers. Burton asks another Transformer, Hot Rod, to find Viviane Wembly, a University of Oxford professor.

Burton explains to Cade, Viviane, and Bumblebee that Transformers have been living amongst mankind for centuries, their existence once guarded by a secret society called the Order of Witwiccans, of which he is the last living member. The talisman can lead to Merlin's staff, buried in a Cybertronian spacecraft under the sea. Viviane is revealed to be the direct descendant of Merlin's bloodline and the only one who can activate the staff. The local authorities, MI6, and the British TRF discover them, forcing them to flee. Following clues, while evading their pursuers, the group head to the Royal Navy Museum, where they commandeer the submarine , also a Transformer, to find the spacecraft while the TRF and the U.S. Navy SEALs tail them.

Burton contacts Seymour Simmons, both learning that Earth is Unicron, and the staff will drain the planet's life via an access point under Stonehenge. Locating the ship, Cade and Viviane find Merlin's tomb with Viviane activating Merlin's buried staff, awakening the Knights of Iacon. The TRF and Navy SEALs ambush Cade and Viviane and take the staff, but are forced to surrender it to Optimus who has arrived to take the staff. Bumblebee, Cade, and Lennox engage Optimus, during which Bumblebee speaks in his voice for the first time after he was given a spare voice box, stirring Optimus's memories and freeing him from Quintessa's control. The Decepticons ambush Optimus and Cade and steal the staff. The Knights arrive to execute Optimus, but yield to Cade and join the humans and the Autobots upon seeing Cade's talisman turn into Excalibur. Burton tries to stop Megatron from activating the staff at Stonehenge, only to get killed.

As Cybertron's remains ravaged Earth, the Autobots, Dragonstorm, and the humans, now working with the reformed TRF, launched a direct assault on Cybertron to defeat the Decepticons, Megatron, and Quintessa. During the battle, Viviane removes the staff and stops the transfer. Optimus defeats Megatron while Bumblebee seemingly kills Quintessa. With both worlds saved, the Autobots leave Earth to rebuild Cybertron.

Meanwhile, Quintessa, having to survive the battle, disguised herself as a human and approaches a group of scientists inspecting one of Unicron's horns and offers them a way to destroy him.

Cast

Humans
 Mark Wahlberg as Cade Yeager: A single father and inventor who helped the Autobots during the events of Age of Extinction.
 Josh Duhamel as William Lennox: A former NEST commander and U.S. Army Ranger who partnered with the Autobots prior to the events of Dark of the Moon, and now a U.S. Army Special Forces Colonel and reluctant member of the Transformers Reaction Force (TRF).
 Stanley Tucci as Wizard Merlin: A wizard who helped the Guardian Knights. He previously portrayed Joshua Joyce in Age of Extinction.
 Anthony Hopkins as Sir Edmund Burton, 12th Earl of Folgan: An astronomer and historian who knows about the history of the Transformers on Earth.
 Laura Haddock as Viviane Wembly: A professor of English Literature at the University of Oxford and a polo player, who turns out to be a descendant of Merlin. Minti Gorne portrays a younger Viviane. 
 Isabela Moner as Izabella: A street-wise who was orphaned by the Battle of Chicago in Dark of the Moon and now lives in the city ruins with Sqweeks and Canopy, her only friends, until meeting Cade.
 Jerrod Carmichael as Jimmy: A young man from South Dakota whom Cade hired through a want ad.
 Santiago Cabrera as Santos: A former Delta Force operative an commander of the TRF, who seeks to eradicate every Transformer and their human allies regardless of faction. He also tries to capture or kill Cade Yeager as he knows he's working with the Autobots.
 John Turturro as Seymour Simmons: A former government agent of Sector 7 and NEST turned successful writer who hides out in Cuba, and was allied with the Autobots prior to the events of Dark of the Moon.
 Glenn Morshower as General Morshower: A former leader of NEST in Revenge of the Fallen and Dark of the Moon who now supervises TRF operations. 
 Liam Garrigan as King Arthur: The legendary knight who first fought with the Knights of Iacon. Garrigan previously portrayed a different iteration of King Arthur in the fifth season of the TV series Once Upon a Time.

Additionally, Mitch Pileggi, Tony Hale, and Gil Birmingham appear as a TRF group leader, an arrogant JPL engineer, and Chief Sherman, respectively. Former Navy SEAL Remi Adeleke also stars in the film as an unnamed TRF lieutenant working for Santos, alongside other Navy SEAL veterans who play Navy SEALS in the movie's climax. Nicola Peltz has a vocal cameo as Tessa Yeager, Cade's daughter, who helped the Autobots during the events of Age of Extinction and is seen in a photograph in Cade's trailer, while Shia LaBeouf is seen as Sam Witwicky, who allied with the Autobots in events prior to Age of Extinction, in a photograph spotted in Burton's mansion. Stephen Hogan plays Viviane's father in flashback scenes.

Voices

 Peter Cullen as Optimus Prime / Nemesis Prime: The leader of the Autobots, who is searching for the truth about his Creators. In this film, he transforms into a blue and red 2014 Western Star 5700 Custom semi-trailer truck.
 Frank Welker as Megatron: The leader of the Decepticons, who possessed a KSI Drone in Age of Extinction and transforms into a Cybertronian jet.
 Gemma Chan as Quintessa: A Cybertronian Sorceress, the "Prime of Life" and the creator of the Cybertronians who wants to destroy Unicron (and Earth) and rebuild Cybertron through whatever way possible. Chan appears on-screen briefly as Quintessa in a disguised human form, at the end of the film.
 Erik Aadahl as Bumblebee / ZB-7: An Autobot scout and Optimus Prime's second-in-command, who transforms into a custom-built yellow and black 2017 Chevrolet Camaro with a body kit.
 Jim Carter as Cogman: A polite but sociopathic, human-sized autobot. He serves as the faithful butler to Sir Edmund Burton, and while despite not having a larger robot mode, he transforms into an 2017 Aston Martin DB11 in the toyline.
 Omar Sy as Hot Rod: An Autobot who transforms into a 1975 Citroën DS, before upgrading into a 2017 Lamborghini Centenario LP770-4. He is brother-in-arms with Bumblebee and speaks in a thick French accent which he's ashamed of and wishes to remove.
 Ken Watanabe as Drift: A Samurai-motif Autobot tactician and former Decepticon who transforms into a black and red 2017 Mercedes-AMG GT R.
 John Goodman as Hound: A trigger-happy Autobot commando and field medic who transforms into an olive green Mercedes-Benz Unimog military tactical ambulance.
 John DiMaggio as:
 Crosshairs: A cocky Autobot paratrooper and sniper who transforms into a green and black 2017 Chevrolet Corvette C7 Stingray, equipped with a custom split-spoiler. His ego lends him a misplaced belief in his future command of the Autobots.
 Nitro Zeus: A showboating Decepticon hunter who transforms into a JAS 39 Gripen Fighter Jet. 
 Reno Wilson as:
 Sqweeks: A small Autobot and Izabella's closest friend who can't transform into a blue Vespa and only says "Chihuahua" due to prior damage.
 Mohawk: A talkative and psychotic Decepticon foot soldier who transforms into a Confederate P51 Combat Fighter Motorcycle. His spark is in his head due to his body being skinny.
 Jess Harnell as Barricade: A Decepticon scout who was thought to have been killed in Dark of the Moon. He now transforms into a 2016 Ford Mustang police car, featuring a new, sleeker robot mode.
 Tom Kenny as Wheelie: An Autobot and former Decepticon who survived the Chicago battle in Dark of the Moon who transforms into a remote-controlled monster truck.
 Steve Buscemi as Daytrader: An Autobot scavenger who transforms into a cloaked rusty Mercedes-Benz LK Model 1920 dump truck.
 Steven Barr as Topspin: An Autobot Wrecker who resides in Cuba with Simmons that once transformed into a #48 Hendrick Motorsports Lowe's/Kobalt car. In the film he is credited as "Volleybot" and grew a metallic beard that resembles his fallen comrade, Leadfoot.
 Mark Ryan as:
 "WWII Tank": An Autobot veteran of World War I and World War II, and a sentry for Burton's castle, who transforms into an army green Mark IV tank and suffers from 'robot dementia', 
 "Lieutenant": An elderly Autobot that transforms into a Hawker Hurricane fighter plane that cameos at Burton's castle.
 Various uncredited actors voice:
 The Knights of Iacon: a group of twelve Cybertronian Knights that protects the Staff and merge to form the three-headed dragon, Dragonstorm. They include Dragonicus, Stormreign, Steelbane, and Skullitron.
 Canopy: An Autobot refugee and a friend of Izabella who transforms into a shielding pile of rubble.
 Berserker: A monstrous Decepticon commando who transforms into a 2017 Chevy Tahoe emergency vehicle.
 Onslaught: A Decepticon tactician who transforms into a green Western Star 4900SF tow truck.

Non-speaking characters
 Grimlock   The leader of the Dinobots, who transforms into a mechanical horned, fire-breathing Tyrannosaurus.
 Slug   The savage Dinobot destroyer who transforms into a mechanical spiked and bestial Triceratops.
 Mini-Dinobots   The Mini versions of Grimlock, Slug, and Strafe named: Sharp T! (mini Grimlock), 'Tops (mini Slug), Pterry (mini strafe with only one head)
 A Transformer who turns into the submarine  appears, though not seen in robot mode as it can't transform. 
 Trench   An Autobot who resembles Constructicon Scrapper and transforms into a Cat 320 excavator.
 Dreadbot   A Decepticon thug who transforms into a rusty 1960 Volkswagen Type 2.
 Infernocons   Quintessa's demonic guardians who combine to form Infernocus. 
 Unicron   A giant planet-destroying Transformer appearing as Planet Earth and six of his mechanical horns are seen.

Production

Development

In March 2015, Deadline Hollywood reported that Paramount Pictures was in talks with Akiva Goldsman to pitch new ideas and plans for the future of the series. The studio intended to do what James Cameron and 20th Century Fox have been doing in planning three Avatar sequels, and what Disney has done to revive Star Wars, with sequels and spin-offs. Paramount wanted to have their own cinematic universe for Transformers, similar to the Marvel Cinematic Universe (MCU) and the DC Extended Universe (DCEU). Goldsman became the head of future projects, and worked with franchise director Michael Bay, executive producer Steven Spielberg, and producer Lorenzo di Bonaventura to organize a "writers' room" or "brain trust" to incubate ideas for potential Transformers sequels. The writers' room members include Christina Hodson, Lindsey Beer, Ken Nolan, Andrew Barrer, Gabriel Ferrari, Robert Kirkman, Zak Penn, Art Marcum, Matt Holloway, Jeff Pinkner, and Geneva Robertson-Dworet. Kirkman left the room after just one day to undergo throat surgery. In July 2015, Akiva Goldsman and Jeff Pinkner were announced as the fifth Transformers film's screenwriters. On November 20, due to Goldsman's commitments creating a writers' room for G.I. Joe and Micronauts properties, Paramount began to negotiate with Art Marcum and Matt Holloway, as well as Ken Nolan, to write the film. Lindsey Beer and Geneva Robertson-Dworet were also brought aboard for writing duties.

After Transformers: Age of Extinction, Bay had decided not to direct any future Transformers films. But in early January 2016, in an interview with Rolling Stone, he stated that he would return to direct the fifth film, and that it would be his last Transformers film. Paramount Pictures spent $80 million on production in Michigan, in return for $21 million in state incentives, under agreements entered into before the state legislature eliminated the film office incentive program in July 2015. In April 2016, Paramount hired cinematographer Jonathan Sela. On May 17, Bay revealed the official title of the film to be The Last Knight on his Instagram account, where he also posted a production video showing a close-up of Optimus Prime's face with purple eyes instead of blue, and his face mostly discolored. The official Twitter account showed a 19-second short video in morse code that translates to "I'm coming for you May 31". On May 31, it was revealed that Megatron would return in the sequel.

Casting
In December 2014, Mark Wahlberg confirmed that he would return in the sequel. In February 2016, there were casting calls for new lead and supporting roles in Los Angeles and London, and Peter Cullen was announced as returning to voice Optimus Prime. Approximately 850 cast and crew were hired, 450 of whom were Michigan residents, equating to 228 full-time positions. Additionally, 700 extras were hired from among Detroit residents, as part of Paramount's incentive deal with the state. On April 13, TheWrap reported that Isabela Moner was in talks to star as Izabella. The site also reported that Bay was eyeing Jean Dujardin, Stephen Merchant, and Jerrod Carmichael for supporting roles. On May 17, 2016, it was confirmed that Josh Duhamel would reprise his role in the film, and Jerrod Carmichael was cast. In June 2016, Anthony Hopkins, Mitch Pileggi, Santiago Cabrera, and Laura Haddock joined the cast, and Tyrese Gibson stated that he will return as Robert Epps. In August 2016, Liam Garrigan was confirmed to play King Arthur, a different version from his role as the same character on the television series Once Upon a Time. On September 4, 2016, Stanley Tucci confirmed his return. On October 14, 2016, Bay announced that John Turturro would reprise his role as Seymour Simmons from the first three films, and that John Goodman would return to voice Hound. A month before the film's release, Bay revealed that the character Cogman would be voiced by Downton Abbey actor Jim Carter, at the request of co-writer Matt Holloway, who is a fan of the series. On June 9, 2017, Reno Wilson confirmed he would have a voice role in the film. On June 16, 2017, Gibson revealed that despite closing a deal for the film, he was unable to appear as Epps due to scheduling conflicts with The Fate of the Furious. Longtime Transformers voice actor Frank Welker voices Megatron for the first time in the live-action film series, reprising the role from The Transformers, Transformers Prime and other various media.

Filming

Principal photography began on May 25, 2016, in Havana, Cuba, with a few scenes shot by a "small team". Filming continued on June 6, 2016, in Phoenix, Arizona, and on June 19, 2016, in Detroit, Michigan, under the working title E75, with additional filming taking place in Chicago, Illinois. In Detroit, filming took place in the Michigan Motion Pictures Studio, Packard Plant, Michigan Central Station, Cafe D'Mongo's Speakeasy, and MGM Grand Detroit. Production moved to Europe on August 21, and filming commenced on August 22 in Scotland and Wales. In England, filming took place in North Yorkshire, Newcastle upon Tyne, Northumberland, London, Gosport and Stonehenge. Between August and October, filming occurred in Northern Ireland, and Preikestolen, Trolltunga and Atlanterhavsveien in Norway. The Trinity Library Oxford scene was filmed in the Old Library, Trinity College Dublin.

In early September 2016, filming took place in Alnwick Castle in Alnwick Northumberland in England, including car chase scenes. Production continued at St Aidan's Church, Seahouses, where Walhberg spent an hour inside the church and reportedly donated £200. Rev Father Des McGiven said: "I didn't even know he was in church until he left. One of my parishioners, Danielle Love, recognized him and explained who he was. It's great that we had him in for the service, and we appreciate his generosity towards our church." Car chases were also filmed at the Monument area of Newcastle upon Tyne, where Josh Duhamel was filming, while Wahlberg and Sir Anthony Hopkins continued at Alnwick, Seahouses and the Bamburgh Region of Northumberland. In late September 2016, filming was spotted in Gosport, Hampshire at the Royal Navy Submarine Museum. On October 5, 2016 filming was spotted at St Bartholomew-the-Great, London. London filming wrapped on October 27, 2016. Principal photography wrapped on December 4, 2016.

Scenes were shot in at least four different aspect ratios, including 1.90:1 (IMAX), 2.00:1 (Univisium), 2.28:1, & 2.39:1 (Panavision). This has been stated by the movie's director of photography, Jonathan Sela, to be due to a large number of different types of cameras on set, including the Red 6K Weapon Dragon, the Alexa IMAX 3-D rig and the IMAX 3-D Phantom 65.

Effects
As with previous Transformers installments, Industrial Light & Magic served as the main visual effects company for Transformers: The Last Knight. In early 2016, the company showed Bay an underwater rendering of a crash-landed alien spaceship and a new dump-truck Transformer with a cloak.

Music

On September 27, it was confirmed that Steve Jablonsky would return to write the score, having composed the music for the first four films. The score was released digitally on the film's original release date, Friday June 23, 2017, and a limited-edition two-disc CD set of 3,000 units will be released by La-La Land Records on July 25, 2017. Unlike the previous films' scores, which contained anywhere from fourteen to twenty-three tracks, the film's soundtrack contains thirty-four tracks, amounting to over two hours of music.

On the score, Jablonsky said, "I met with Michael before he started shooting 'Transformers: The Last Knight.' He showed me some amazing concept art and explained how the story connects the history of Transformers all the way back to the times of King Arthur and the Knights of the Round Table. I loved the idea because it gave me the opportunity to explore new musical ideas. The storyline allowed me to write melodies that are a bit more 'classical' than I've written for the other Transformers films, which was a lot of fun for me. Another important aspect of the story revolves around massive skyscraper-sized 'horns from hell' that start emerging from the Earth. They look like gigantic animal horns, but no one knows what they are or why they have appeared. I wanted to create an unsettling sense of mystery and tension with the music."

Controversy 

 
On September 21, 2016, shooting for a particular scene took place in Blenheim Palace, Woodstock, Oxfordshire in England, the home of Sir Winston Churchill, the British Prime Minister during World War II. The mansion was dressed as a Nazi swastika-draped headquarters for Adolf Hitler for filming. Tony Hayes of the UK Veterans Association stated that surviving World War II ex-servicemen and women would be "appalled". Churchill's grandson and British Parliament member Sir Nicholas Soames dismissed the controversy entirely, stating, "They've no idea what my grandfather would have thought!" Churchill was buried less than a mile away, at St Martin's Church, Bladon.

Release

Theatrical
Transformers: The Last Knight was released on June 21, 2017, after being moved up from its original June 23 release date.

Home media
Transformers: The Last Knight was released on Digital HD on September 12, 2017, and on Blu-ray, Blu-ray 4K, Blu-ray 3D and DVD on September 26, 2017, in North America. It was also released in a collection with the four previous films.

Reception

Box office
Transformers: The Last Knight grossed $130.1 million in the United States and Canada and $475.3 million in other territories for a worldwide total of $605.4 million, against a production budget of $217–260 million.
The film reportedly lost Paramount over $100 million and was deemed a commercial failure due to competition from Despicable Me 3, Wonder Woman, Spider-Man: Homecoming, War for the Planet of the Apes, and Dunkirk with the latter making the least in worldwide earnings when comparing the five films but Transformers: The Last Knight had the least total in North America.

In North America, The Last Knight was originally projected to gross $70–75 million from 4,069 theaters over its first five days, which would have been the lowest debut of the franchise. However, after the film grossed a franchise-low $15.7 million on its first day (including $5.5 million from Tuesday night previews), opening estimates were lowered to $60–65 million. On Thursday, it grossed $8.1 million, potentially dropping the five-day debut to under $60 million. It ended up having an opening weekend of $44.7 million, the lowest debut of the franchise by $25 million (and lowest since the first film's $70.5 million). The film's five-day gross of $68.5 million was also lower than every three-day opening of the previous four films. The film grossed $16.9 million in its second weekend, dropping 62.2% and finishing third at the box office, and $6.4 million in its third, dropping an identical 62.2% and finishing 5th.

Internationally, The Last Knight opened in its first 42 international territories alongside its United States debut, including major markets China, the UK, Russia, Australia, Germany, Italy, South Korea, and Hong Kong, and was projected to have an opening of $167–200 million. Due to its predecessor's success in China, expectations were high for the film in the country. Box office observers and trackers believed the film would open to $80–100 million, and end its run there with anywhere between $290 to $400 million. The film ended up having a global debut of $265.3 million ($196.2 million from other territories), including $123.4 million from China, representing 63% of the film's international opening. In the film's second week in China, it fell 76% and had a running cumulative total of $147.6 million. The film's largest markets outside North America were: China ($228.8 million), South Korea ($19.2 million), Russia ($15.9 million), Germany ($15.4 million), Mexico ($15.3 million), U.K. ($12.2 million), Brazil ($13.7 million), Indonesia ($11.7 million), Japan ($15.7 million) and France ($11 million).

Critical response
The site's critical consensus reads, "Cacophonous, thinly plotted, and boasting state-of-the-art special effects, The Last Knight is pretty much what you'd expect from the fifth installment of the Transformers franchise." On Metacritic, the film has a weighted average score of 27 out of 100 based on 47 critics, indicating "generally unfavorable reviews". Audiences polled by CinemaScore gave the film an average grade of "B+" on an A+ to F scale, the same score as the second film, while PostTrak reported filmgoers gave a 75% overall positive score and a 55% "definite recommend".

Peter Travers of Rolling Stone gave the film a zero-star review (as he did to the previous films), saying "Every time Michael Bay directs another Transformers abomination (this is the fifth), the movies die a little. This one makes the summer's other blockbuster misfires look like masterpieces." Mike Ryan of Uproxx gave the film a negative review, criticizing its running time and incoherent plot, writing: "I have no proof Transformers: The Last Knight will kill your brain cells, but I wouldn't be surprised to learn that it does and I'd proceed with caution just in case. But I can say with absolute certainty that after watching, your head  hurt." Emily Yoshida of Vulture.com gave the film a negative review but wrote: "I feel slightly worried about how little I hated it." Yoshida thought it was marginally better than the previous film: "The Last Knight remains barely coherent. But it's more fun than "Age of Extinction," though both movies are so drunk on money and effects they accidentally go weird." Yoshida grudgingly praised the "visual and sonic imagination" shown by the filmmakers. Alonso Duralde of TheWrap was also critical of the film's sloppiness, saying, "...fear not, fans of the franchise: if you're here for the director's trademark chaos editing (where fights go from points A to D to Q), comedy scenes rendered tragic (and vice versa), and general full-volume confusion, you'll get all those things in abundance."

Peter Bradshaw of The Guardian gave it 1 out of 5, complained about the long runtime, and suggested the film was "competing with Marvel movies for spectacle" but without the "wit and fun". Christopher Orr of The Atlantic criticized the film for attempting to connect the Transformers to Stonehenge and World War II, and called it the worst retelling of Arthurian legend of the year, even worse than Guy Ritchie's King Arthur: Legend of the Sword. Rebecca Farley of Refinery29 and Dana Schwartz of Marie Claire were critical of the underdeveloped female characters. Farley noted the marketing made Moner appear to have a prominent role in the film, when she does not. Farley also labeled Haddock's character the film's "textbook Strong Woman" cliché. Schwartz criticizes Wahlberg's character for referring to Moner's as "Little J. Lo" because of her Latina heritage, and Haddock being portrayed as the "British Megan Fox". Schwartz also criticized the film for the frequent aspect ratio changes, and the runtime being too long. Ian Freer of Empire magazine rated the film 2 out of 5 stars. Freer said that like the previous films it "is bogged down in backstory, lacks a real feel for its characters and still can’t find a way to make its robot-on-robot action exhilarating... It is amazing how a series with so much nostalgic goodwill, technical finesse and behind the scenes talent have led so often to experiences that are so joyless."

Variety's Owen Gleiberman gave the film a mixed review stating, "The fifth time may not quite be the charm, but the latest entry in Michael Bay's crunched-metal robot-war mega-series is badder, and therefore better." Richard Brody of The New Yorker acknowledged the film's flaws but noted there was almost something impressive about them, saying: "The absolute tastelessness of Bay's images, their stultifying service to platitudes and to merchandise, doesn't at all diminish their wildly imaginative power." Robbie Collin of The Telegraph wrote "If you're not staggered by the technique on display here – the stuff that sets Bay's work miles above the Fast & Furiouses, X-Men: Apocalypses and Tom Cruise-chasing Mummies of this world – you're not paying attention" and called it "a cinematic experience of earth-shattering preposterousness". Justin Chang of the Los Angeles Times wrote: "Bay's visual sensibility has, if anything, matured, to the point of demanding and earning your exasperated surrender." Joshua Rothkopf of Time Out New York gave it 3 out of 5, calling it "Clangorous and nonsensical" but "Regardless of our opinions, we all know what a Michael Bay film is. This one's his most Baysome."

Accolades
Transformers: The Last Knight led the 38th Golden Raspberry Awards season with 10 nominations (including The Razzie Nominee So Rotten You Loved It, Worst Picture, Worst Director, Worst Screen Combo, and Worst Screenplay) but did not win in any category, setting the record for most Razzie nominations without a win.

Future

Possible sequel 

Akiva Goldsman was tasked with developing a multi-part sequel storyline, along with prequels and spin-off films. A "brain trust" was commissioned to guide the productions of these stories, including Goldsman, Michael Bay, and producers Steven Spielberg and Lorenzo di Bonaventura. The team of writers who were hired included: Robert Kirkman, Art Marcum, Matt Holloway, Zak Penn, Jeff Pinkner, Andrew Barrer, Gabriel Ferrari, Christina Hodson, Lindsey Beer, Ken Nolan, Geneva Robertson-Dworet, and Steven DeKnight. Goldsman described the writer's room collaboration process, as a way to map out stories that can be further developed by the projects that are green-lit by the brain trust; stating: "...if one of the writers discovers an affinity for [a particular story], they can drive forward on treatments that will have been fleshed out by the whole room." Barrer and Ferrari were hired and assigned to co-write a film that would explore the origins of Cybertron, with a working title of Transformers One.

Before the release of The Last Knight, Michael Bay said it would be his last film as director in the franchise but expressed interest in remaining as a producer should they wish to continue the series with another director. Bay confirmed in April 2017 that out of the writer's room, at least 14 stories had been completed for potential future Transformers films. Following the negative reception and disappointing box office performance of The Last Knight, the future of the series was uncertain. By August 2017, Akiva Goldsman revealed he was no longer leading the writer's room and had left the franchise. In February 2018, the film was removed from the studio's release schedule. In March 2019, di Bonaventura announced that sequels to both the solo film and The Last Knight were in development: "One is the latest in the main family series following Transformers: The Last Knight and the other is a sequel to Bumblebee". The producer later said that the follow-up to The Last Knight would not be a sequel. In May 2020, Paramount scheduled a release date of June 24, 2022 for the next live-action Transformers film, which was later revealed to be the sequel to Bumblebee. In an interview in September 2021, when asked about the possibility of a film taking place after The Last Knight, Josh Duhamel had expressed interest in reprising his role as Colonel William Lennox.

Bumblebee (2018)

A prequel to the film series titled Bumblebee, starring Hailee Steinfeld and John Cena, was released on December 21, 2018 to a successful critical and financial reception. 

In December 2018, producer Lorenzo Di Bonaventura announced that there will be further films in the series following the release of Bumblebee, acknowledging that the franchise will make some changes in their tone and style after the success of Bumblebee.

Transformers: Rise of the Beasts (2023)

A sequel to Bumblebee titled Transformers: Rise of the Beasts, starring Anthony Ramos and Dominique Fishback, is scheduled to be released on June 9, 2023.

By January 2020, a follow up to Bumblebee, and an adaptation of Transformers: Beast Wars was in development, written separately by Joby Harold and James Vanderbilt, respectively. The title Transformers: Rise of the Beasts was announced, and it was revealed that the story would include parts of both storylines.

Notes

References

External links

 
 
 

2010s American films
2010s chase films
2010s disaster films
2010s English-language films
2010s science fiction adventure films
2010s superhero films
2017 3D films
2017 films
2017 science fiction action films
American 3D films
American chase films
American disaster films
American science fantasy films
American science fiction action films
American science fiction adventure films
American sequel films
Apocalyptic films
Arthurian films
Di Bonaventura Pictures films
Drone films
Film controversies in the United Kingdom
Film controversies
Films about ancient astronauts
Films about dragons
Films about impact events
Films about orphans
Films about the United States Army
Films directed by Michael Bay
Films produced by Don Murphy
Films produced by Ian Bryce
Films produced by Lorenzo di Bonaventura
Films produced by Tom DeSanto
Films scored by Steve Jablonsky
Films set in 2019
Films set in Chicago
Films set in England
Films set in Germany
Films set in Havana
Films set in London
Films set in Namibia
Films set in South Dakota
Films set in the Middle Ages
Films set in Washington, D.C.
Films shot in Arizona
Films shot in Chicago
Films shot in Detroit
Films shot in Dublin (city)
Films shot in Hampshire
Films shot in Havana
Films shot in London
Films shot in Northern Ireland
Films shot in Northumberland
Films shot in Norway
Films shot in Oxfordshire
Films shot in Scotland
Films shot in Wales
Films with screenplays by Akiva Goldsman
Films with screenplays by Art Marcum and Matt Holloway
Films with screenplays by Ken Nolan
IMAX films
Live-action films based on animated series
Obscenity controversies in film
Paramount Pictures films
Secret histories
Submarine films
Last Knight
Treasure hunt films